S.L.B.S Engineering College is a technical college in Jodhpur. It is located on Jodhpur-Jaipur High-Way, Near Dangiyawas at about 25 km from Jodhpur Railway Station. It is approved by AICTE(All India Council for Technical Education) and affiliated to Bikaner Technical University. SLBS Engineering College is a Unit of Shri Lal Bahadur Shastri Research & Training Institute.

Mission
To impart world class Teaching education, maintaining a high standard of academic and human values. To enable them to develop habit of learning so that they can face the challenges of this fact changing global society.

Academics

Integrated first degree
S.L.B.S offers four-year programmes in Bachelor of Engineering in the following fields:

 Civil Engineering
 Electrical Engineering
 Mechanical Engineering
 Computer Science
 Electronics and Communication Engineering
 Information Technology

See also
 List of universities and higher education colleges in Jodhpur
 Rajasthan Technical University
Arid Forest Research Institute (AFRI) Jodhpur

References

Engineering colleges in Jodhpur
Colleges in Jodhpur